The Cathedral of St. Michael the Archangel is a Byzantine Catholic (Ruthenian) cathedral located in Passaic, New Jersey, United States.  It is the cathedral for the Eparchy of Passaic.

History
Eastern Europeans began to immigrate to the Passaic area in 1877.  Father Alexander Dzubay began ministering to Byzantine Catholics in 1880 and ten years later St. Michael the Archangel parish was established.  The former Evangelical Mission Chapel at the corner of First and Bergen streets was purchased in 1891 and Father Nicephor Chanath became the parish's first resident pastor.  Construction on the present church was begun in 1902 and it was completed in 1905.  Property was acquired in 1917 that became St. Michael's Cemetery.  In 1953 the former Passaic School No. 2 became St. Michael's School and classes began on September 9.

The Eparchy of Passaic was established on July 31, 1963 and St. Michael's Church became the cathedral.  Construction began in 1985 on the Cathedral Chapel of St. Michael and Social Center in West Paterson.  It was dedicated on May 31, 1987.

See also
List of Catholic cathedrals in the United States
List of cathedrals in the United States

References

External links

Extensive History-Found at The Carpathian Connection
Official Cathedral Site

Religious organizations established in 1890
Churches completed in 1905
Eastern Catholic churches in New Jersey
Rusyn-American culture in New Jersey
Rusyn-American history
Ukrainian-American culture in New Jersey
Michael, Passaic
Churches in Passaic County, New Jersey
Churches in Passaic, New Jersey
Byzantine Revival architecture in New Jersey
Catholic cathedrals in New Jersey
1880 establishments in New Jersey